Nam Singh Thapa was a boxer from Nepal who participated in the 1964 Summer Olympics, Tokyo.

Career
He participated in 1964 Summer Olympics in the Men's Flyweight Event at the age of 18. He was ranked 9th in the overall tournament. He fought against Bob Carmody of USA in Round 2 where he was defeated.

1964 Olympic results
Below is the record of Nam Singh Thapa, a Nepalese flyweight boxer who competed at the 1964 Tokyo Olympics:

 Round of 32: bye
 Round of 16: lost to Robert Carmody (United States) referee stopped contest

References

External links
 

1946 births
Flyweight boxers
Nepalese male boxers
Living people
People from Gorkha District
Boxers at the 1964 Summer Olympics
Olympic boxers of Nepal